
Gmina Zakliczyn is an urban-rural gmina (administrative district) in Tarnów County, Lesser Poland Voivodeship, in southern Poland.

The gmina contains part of the protected area called Ciężkowice-Rożnów Landscape Park.

Villages
Apart from the town of Zakliczyn, Gmina Zakliczyn contains the villages and settlements of Bieśnik, Borowa, Charzewice, Dzierżaniny, Faliszowice, Faściszowa, Filipowice, Gwoździec, Jamna, Kończyska, Lusławice, Melsztyn, Olszowa, Paleśnica, Roztoka, Ruda Kameralna, Słona, Stróże, Wesołów, Wola Stróska, Wróblowice, Zawada Lanckorońska and Zdonia.

Neighbouring gminas
Gmina Zakliczyn is bordered by the gminas of Ciężkowice, Czchów, Dębno, Gródek nad Dunajcem, Gromnik, Korzenna, Pleśna and Wojnicz.

References
Polish official population figures 2006

Zakliczyn
Tarnów County